Paparazzi: Eye in the Dark is a 2011 romantic mystery film directed by Bayo Akinfemi and starring Van Vicker, Koby Maxwell, Tchidi Chikere, Syr Law, JJ Bunny and Chet Anekwe. The film depicts the adventures of an aspiring photographer whose accidental picture exposes an infamous murder mystery. The film was initially slated for a direct-to-video release but as of February, 2011 was scheduled for a multiple-city limited theatrical release. Made for a low six-figure budget and filmed over the course of 19 days, the film has been known in the Nollywood USA market as the film that has changed the look and sound of Nollywood by introducing a more western approach to production quality. Notably the filmmakers employed the experience of an American filmmaker (Tim "Black Magic Tim" Wilson) to serve as cinematographer and editor.

Plot
Aspiring photographer Rich Amarah (Van Vicker) dreams of making his fortune through his art but finds the life of being a sneaky paparazzi spy more lucrative. By selling pictures to the national newspapers, he has the opportunity to rub shoulders with the rich and famous. Superstar Ghanaian recording artist Mr. Maxx (Koby Maxwell) is at the top of the paparazzi food chain, and Rich's appetite for success leads him into a whirlwind of chaos when he accidentally films the "scoop of the century". This event not only becomes the paper's biggest exclusive but threatens his very survival as he alone holds the images to the city's biggest murder mystery.

Cast
 Van Vicker as Rich Amarah
 Koby Maxwell as Mr Maxx
 Tchidi Chikere as Jimmy
 Syr Law as Pearl
 Chet Anekwe as Davis
 Bayo Akinfemi as Pat
 JJ Bunny as Jackie
 Princess Pursia as Donna

Production

Music
The soundtrack contains numerous tracks from artists of Nigeria, Ghana and the United States. Koby Maxwell introduces his song "Do It" as well as "Facebook Girl". Paul G has several tracks as well which include "Let It Flow" and "These Girls". Paul G has notably released a music video with recording artist Akon; called "Bang It All". New artist Irina also debuts her tracks "So Free" and "Cega".

Nominations 
 2011 WMIFF: Best Cinematography in a Feature Film
 2011 WMIFF: Best Cinematography DMV
 2011 WMIFF: Best Screenplay in a Feature Film
 2011 WMIFF: Best Original Sound
 2011 WMIFF: Best Actor in a Feature Film
 2011 WMIFF: Best Actress in a Feature Film
 2011 NAFC Awards: Best Film in the Diaspora
 2011 NAFC Awards: Best Film
 2011 NAFC Awards: Best Soundtrack
 2011 NAFC Awards: Best Drama in the Diaspora
 2011 NAFC Awards: Best Director in the Diaspora
 2011 NAFC Awards: Best Actress in a Leading Role
 2011 NAFC Awards: Best Actor in a Supporting Role
 2011 GHANA MOVIE Awards: Best Visual Effects
 2011 GHANA MOVIE Awards: Best Sound Editing and Mixing
 2011 GHANA MOVIE Awards: Best Original Music
 2012 Pan African Film Festival: Official Selection
 2012 AFRICAN MOVIE Academy Awards: Best Film By An African Living Aboard

Awards 
 2011 WMIFF: Best Cinematography
 2011 NAFCA: Best Film in the Diaspora
 2011 NAFCA: Best Director in the Diaspora
 2011 NAFCA: Best Cinematography in the Diaspora
 2011 NAFCA: Best Actress in Leading Role
 2011 NAFCA: Best Actor in a Supporting Role

References

External links
 
 

Nigerian independent films
English-language Nigerian films
2010s English-language films